The Mexican Secretariat of Agrarian Reform (Spanish: Secretaría de la Reforma Agraria, SRA) was a Secretariat in the cabinet of Mexico. It was created under the Organic Law of the Federal Public Administration, where Article 41 corresponds to the exercise of the functions and powers expressly stated in Article 27 of the Constitution of Mexico, which establishes the right of farm workers to own the land they work on.

By 2013, the Secretariat of Agrarian Reform was replaced by the Secretariat of Agrarian, Land, and Urban Development.

Organization chart
To carry out these functions, the Agrarian Reform Secretariat has the following units:

 Undersecretariat for Rural Property Management
 Undersecretariat for Sector Policy
 Legal Affairs Unit

Decentralized administrative bodies and entities
To carry out these functions, the Secretariat has the following units:

 National Agrarian Registry
 Agrarian Attorney's Office
 National Trust Fund for Popular Rooms
 National Land Development Fund Trust
 Commission for the Regularization of Land Tenure
 National Housing Commission
 Support Fund for Unregulated Agrarian Nuclei

List of secretaries of agrarian reform of Mexico 

 Government of Luis Echeverría (1970–1976)
 (1975): Augusto Gómez Villanueva
 (1975–1976): Félix Barra García

 Government of José López Portillo (1976–1982)
 (1976–1978): Jorge Rojo Lugo
 (1978–1980): Antonio Toledo Corro
 (1980–1981): Javier García Paniagua
 (1981–1982): Gustavo Carvajal Moreno

 Government of Miguel de la Madrid (1982–1988)
 (1982–1986): Luis Martínez Villicaña
 (1986–1988): Rafael Rodríguez Barrera

 Government of Carlos Salinas de Gortari (1988–1994)
 (1988–1994): Víctor Cervera Pacheco

 Government of Ernesto Zedillo (1994–2000)
 (1994–1995): Miguel Limón Rojas
 (1995–1999): Arturo Warman Gryj
 (1999–2000): Eduardo Robledo Rincón

 Government of Vicente Fox (2000–2006)
 (2000–2003): María Teresa Herrera Tello
 (2003–2006): Florencio Salazar Adame
 (2006) Abelardo Escobar Prieto

 Cabinet of Felipe Calderón Hinojosa (2006–2012)
 (2006–2012): Abelardo Escobar Prieto

 Cabinet of Enrique Peña Nieto (2012–2018)
 (2012–2013): Jorge Carlos Ramírez Marín

References

External links
Official site of the President's Cabinet

Agrarian Reform
Mexican Secretaries of the Agrarian Reform